{{DISPLAYTITLE:Vitamin B8}}
Vitamin B8 is a former designation given to several distinct chemical compounds, which is not considered a true vitamin:

 Adenosine monophosphate (AMP), or 5'-adylenic acid
 Inositol